Oliver Eaton Williamson (September 27, 1932 – May 21, 2020) was an American economist, a professor at the University of California, Berkeley, and recipient of the 2009 Nobel Memorial Prize in Economic Sciences, which he shared with Elinor Ostrom.

His contributions to transaction cost economics and the theory of the firm are influential in the social sciences.

Life and career
Williamson was born in Superior, Wisconsin, on 27 September 1932. He was the son of Sara Lucille (Dunn) and Scott Williamson, both of whom were high school teachers.

Williamson attended Central High School in Superior.  He received his BSc in management from the MIT Sloan School of Management in 1955. After graduating, he worked as a project engineer for General Electric, as well as the Central Intelligence Agency.

Williamson received an MBA from Stanford University in 1960, and his PhD from Carnegie Mellon University in 1963. A student of Ronald Coase, Herbert A. Simon and Richard Cyert, he specialized in transaction cost economics.

From 1963 to 1965 he was an Assistant Professor of Economics at the University of California, Berkeley. From 1965 to 1983 he was a professor at the University of Pennsylvania and from 1983 to 1988, a Gordon B. Tweedy Professor of Economics of Law and Organization at Yale University. While at Yale, Williamson was a founder of The Journal of Law, Economics, & Organization. He held professorships in business administration, economics, and law at the University of California, Berkeley since 1988 and was the Edgar F. Kaiser Professor Emeritus at the Haas School of Business. As a Fulbright Distinguished Chair, in 1999 he taught Economics at the University of Siena.

Found to be one of the most cited authors in the social sciences, in 2009, he was awarded the Nobel Memorial Prize in Economics for "his analysis of economic governance, especially the boundaries of the firm", sharing it with Elinor Ostrom. Williamson died on May 21, 2020 in Berkeley, California.

Theory
By drawing attention at a high theoretical level to equivalences and differences between market and non-market decision-making, management and service provision, Williamson was influential in the 1980s and 1990s debates on the boundaries between the public and private sectors.

His focus on the costs of transactions led Williamson to distinguish between repeated case-by-case bargaining on the one hand and relationship-specific contracts on the other. For example, the repeated purchasing of coal from a spot market to meet the daily or weekly needs of an electric utility would represent case-by-case bargaining. But over time, the utility is likely to form ongoing relationships with a specific supplier, and the economics of the relationship-specific dealings will be importantly different, he argued.

Other economists have tested Williamson's transaction-cost theories in empirical contexts. One important example is a paper by Paul L. Joskow, "Contract Duration and Relationship-Specific Investments: Empirical Evidence from Coal Markets", in American Economic Review, March 1987. The incomplete contracts approach to the theory of the firm and corporate finance is partly based on the work of Williamson and Coase.

Williamson was credited with the development of the term "information impactedness", which applies in situations of unequal access to information. As he explained in Markets and Hierarchies, it exists "mainly because of uncertainty and opportunism, though bounded rationality is involved as well. It exists when true underlying circumstances relevant to the transaction, or related set of transactions, are known to one or more parties but cannot be costlessly discerned by or displayed for others". Thus, Williamson is to be counted among those who have taken issue with the view that the firm is another type of market, characterized by a nexus of contracts. In his own words: "But to regard the corporation only as a nexus of contracts misses much of what is truly distinctive about this mode of governance…"

Nobel Memorial Prize in Economic Sciences

In 2009, the Royal Swedish Academy of Sciences cited Williamson and Elinor Ostrom to share the 10-million Swedish kronor (£910,000; $1.44 million) prize "for his analysis of economic governance, especially the boundaries of the firm". Williamson, in the BBC's paraphrase of the academy's reasoning, "developed a theory where business firms served as structures for conflict resolution".

Personal life
He met his wife Dolores Celini in 1957, while they both lived in Washington, D.C. They had five children.

Awards and fellowships
 The Sveriges Riksbank Prize in Economic Sciences in Memory of Alfred Nobel, 2009.
 Distinguished Fellow, American Economic Association, 2007.
 Horst Claus Recktenwald Prize in Economics, 2004.
 Fellow, American Academy of Political and Social Science, 1997.
 Member, National Academy of Sciences, 1994.
 Fellow, American Academy of Arts and Sciences, 1983.
 Fellow, Econometric Society, 1977.
 Alexander Henderson Award, 1962.
 Doctoris Honoris Causa in Economics, Université Paris-Dauphine, 2012.
 Doctoris Honoris Causa in Economics, Nice University, 2005.
 Doctoris Honoris Causa in Economics, University of Valencia, 2004.
 Doctoris Honoris Causa in Economics, University of Chile, 2000.
 Honorary Doctorate in Economics and Business Administration, Copenhagen Business School, 2000.
 Doctoris Honoris Causa, HEC Paris, 1997.
 Doctoris Honoris Causa in Business Administration, St. Petersburg University, 1997.
 Doctoris Honoris Causa in Economics, Turku School of Economics and Business Administration, 1995.
 Doctoris Honoris Causa in Economic Science, Groningen University, 1989.
 Doctoris Honoris Causa in Economic Science, University of St. Gallen, 1987.
 Oeconomiae Doctorem Honoris Causa, PhD, Norwegian School of Economics and Business Administration, Jubilee Celebration, 1986.

Selected papers

Books

See also
 Theory of the firm
 New institutional economics

References

External links

 Oliver E. Williamson at University of California, Berkeley
  including the Nobel Lecture on  8 December 2009 Transaction Cost Economics: The Natural Progression
 Profile and Papers at Research Papers in Economics/RePEc
 

From the Haas School of Business, University of California, Berkeley:
 HNW Story
 Press Release

From the University of California, Berkeley:
 Press Release

In The News:
 San Francisco Chronicle
 Wall Street Journal (October 12, 2009)
 Wall Street Journal (October 12, 2009)
 Wall Street Journal (October 12, 2009)
 Wall Street Journal (October 13, 2009)
 New York Times
 Washington Post
 ABC7 News, San Francisco
 KTVU, San Francisco

1932 births
2020 deaths
People from Superior, Wisconsin
New institutional economists
American business theorists
American Nobel laureates
Members of the United States National Academy of Sciences
Nobel laureates in Economics
Fellows of the Econometric Society
Tepper School of Business alumni
Haas School of Business faculty
Stanford Graduate School of Business alumni
MIT Sloan School of Management alumni
University of Pennsylvania faculty
Yale University faculty
Economists from Wisconsin
20th-century American writers
21st-century American non-fiction writers
20th-century American economists
21st-century American economists
Distinguished Fellows of the American Economic Association